Lean Juicy Pork was a promotional interview CD from Industrial supergroup Pigface, released in 1991, as a companion to Welcome to Mexico... Asshole

It mainly featuring members of Pigface discussing what being in the band means to them. The album consists of interviews and a few remixes or "live" versions of songs.

Track listing

Personnel

 Martin Atkins - drums
 Bill Rieflin - drums
 Chris Connelly - vocals
 En Esch - vocals
 Nivek Ogre - vocals
 Paul Raven - bass
 Matt Schultz - keyboards
 William Tucker - guitar

References

1991 albums
Pigface albums